Meet the Hollowheads, also known as Life on the Edge, is a 1989 science fiction black comedy movie written and directed by special-effects makeup artist Thomas R. Burman.  It stars Juliette Lewis, John Glover, Richard Portnow, and Joshua John Miller.  The film is a black comedy and satire of 1950s sitcoms set in a dystopic future populated by bizarre, tentacled creatures which function dually as household appliances and food.

Cast
 
 John Glover as Henry Hollowhead  
  Nancy Mette as Miriam Hollowhead 
 Richard Portnow as Mr. Crabneck  
 Juliette Lewis as Cindy Hollowhead 
 Matt Shakman as Billy Hollowhead 
 Joshua John Miller as Joey  
  Shnutz Burman  as  Spike
  Lightfield Lewis  as Bud Hollowhead 
 Lee Arenberg as Ream Instructor
 Barney Burman as Young Reamer 
 Anne Ramsey as Babbleaxe 
 Bobcat Goldthwait as Cop #1  
 Donovan Scott as Cop #2
 Logan Ramsey as Top Drone
 Layne Britton as Grandpa Hollowhead

External links
 
 

 Co-Writer Lisa Morton's Production Diary
 The Unknown Movies review of the film (archived version dated 2013-03-18)

1989 films
1989 comedy films
American comedy films
1989 directorial debut films
Fictional families
1980s English-language films
1980s American films